The 1990 Champion Hurdle was a horse race held at Cheltenham Racecourse on Tuesday 13 March 1990. It was the 61st running of the Champion Hurdle.

The winner was Sheikh Mohammed's Kribensis, a six-year-old grey gelding trained in Suffolk by Michael Stoute and ridden by Richard Dunwoody. Kribensis's victory was a first in the race for jockey, trainer and owner.

Kribensis had established himself as a top class hurdler by winning the Christmas Hurdle in 1988, but had finished only seventh when 11/8 favourite for the 1989 Champion Hurdle. In 1990 he was made 95/40 second favourite for the Champion Hurdle and won by three lengths from the American-bred stallion Nomadic Way, with the 150/1 outsider Past Glories three quarters of a length away in third place. The 1989 winner Beech Road, the 2/1 favourite, finished in fourth place whilst See You Then the winner in 1985, 1986 and 1987 finished last. Sixteen of the nineteen runners completed the course.

Race details
 Sponsor: Waterford Crystal
 Purse: £83,343; First prize: £50,047
 Going: Good to Firm
 Distance: 2 miles
 Number of runners: 19
 Winner's time: 3m 50.70

Full result

 Abbreviations: nse = nose; nk = neck; hd = head; dist = distance; UR = unseated rider; PU = pulled up; LFT = left at start; SU = slipped up; BD = brought down

Winner's details
Further details of the winner, Kribensis
 Sex: Gelding
 Foaled: 9 February 1984
 Country: Ireland
 Sire: Henbit; Dam: Aquaria (Double-U-Jay)
 Owner: Sheikh Mohammed
 Breeder: Martin Ryan

References

Champion Hurdle
 1990
Champion Hurdle
Champion Hurdle
1990s in Gloucestershire